The EMK Sepik Pride are a semi-professional Papua New Guinean rugby league team from Wewak, East Sepik Province. They will be competing in the Papua New Guinea National Rugby League Competition and their maiden season will be in 2023. They will be playing their home games in Wewak. The Franchise is owned by EMK Constructions Ltd and was founded in 2018.

2023 squad

See also

References

External links

Papua New Guinean rugby league teams
Rugby league in Papua New Guinea
Papua New Guinea National Rugby League